Dale T. Davis is an American writer, educator, publisher, producer, scholar, dramaturge, and advocate for young people. She was one of the founding poets of the "New York State Poets in the Schools" program. As a publisher, she established The Sigma Foundation, a limited edition, private press with Dr. James Sibley Watson, Jr. avant-garde filmmaker and publisher and editor of The Dial magazine, the leading modernist journal of arts and letters. The Sigma Foundation published the work of Margaret Caroline Anderson, Mina Loy, and Djuna Barnes. The Sigma Foundation’s books are in many permanent collections, including The Collection of American Literature, Beinecke Library, Yale University and The Collection of American Women, Smith College.

In 1979, she founded the New York State Literary Center (NYSLC) where she continues to serve as executive director. Davis extended NYSLC’s reach to students at the highest risk for educational failure. Today NYSLC serves the incarcerated through interdisciplinary, strength based arts programs. In 2014, Dale Davis received the Andrew P. Meloni Award from the Monroe County Sheriff's Office for dedication and commitment to improve the education of those incarcerated through NYSLC's arts, education, and rehabilitation programs.

Davis has lectured and conducted teacher education programs in Juneau, Alaska, Honolulu, Hawaii, the Mississippi Delta, and throughout the country. She served as a consultant for youth-related topics to ABC Network. Davis has presented papers on her work with young people at state and national conferences, including College Board's National Forum, Education and The American Future, on employing arts learning with underserved populations to foster cultural understanding and unleash students’ creativity to prepare students to tackle today’s pressing issues. She has served as a panelist for Massachusetts Cultural Council’s first Creative Teaching Fellowships Program, as well as an Education Panelist and Literature Panelist for The New York State Council on The Arts.

As an advocate for Teaching Artists, Davis was one of the founders of New York State's Association of Teaching Artists (ATA) in 1998. In 2006, she became the Association of Teaching Artists’ first Executive Director where she continues to serve.

Davis’ installations, combining the writing of young people and her own photographs, have been exhibited in several prominent venues. She has written 12 theater pieces, adapted from the writing of those with whom she has worked, that have been performed in juvenile justice facilities, prisons, and jails. Her writing has appeared in publications from The Iowa Review to Op-Ed in The New York Times. Recent publications include chapters in Unseen Cinema, Classics In The Classroom and columns in the online publication, The Bakery.

References

External links 
 http://www.nyslc.org/
 http://www.teachingartists.com/

Poets from New York (state)
American educators
Dramaturges
Year of birth missing (living people)
Living people
American women poets
21st-century American women writers